A fembøring is an open, clinker-built, wooden boat of the Nordland or Åfjord type, with similar proportions and appearance as smaller boats of the type (such as faerings). Fembørings traditionally are constructed of fir or pine, are rowed or sailed, and were used as fishing boats.

External links 
Hildringstimen 
Video: Sailing a fembøring
Video: Brisk sayling with a fembøring

See also 
Viking ships
Birlinn
Karve
Knarr

External links 

Types of fishing vessels
Sailboat types